Alexander Greendale (May 25, 1910 - August 21, 1981) was an American playwright and civic leader. He was an adjunct professor at Adelphi University, the editor of two books about housing, and the author of over 70 plays.

Early life
Greendale was born on May 25, 1910 in Chicago. He graduated from the University of Hawaii, and he earned master's degrees from Stanford University and Adelphi University.

Career
Greendale was an adjunct professor at his alma mater, Adelphi University. He was a Guggenheim Fellow in 1942. He was the director of the housing division of the American Jewish Committee from 1970 to 1977, when he became the executive director of the West Side Jewish Community Council. In 1972, he became the vice president of the Inter-religious New Communities Coalition, an organization whose aim was to build new towns in Israel. He edited two books about housing.

Greendale authored over 70 plays, including Dark Clouds, Buried Height, Fingers in the Fog, Little Italy, and Walk Into My Parlor.

Personal life
With his wife Ziva, Greendale had a son and a daughter. They resided in Brooklyn.

Greendale died on August 21, 1981 in New York City, at age 71.

References

1910 births
1981 deaths
People from Chicago
People from Brooklyn
University of Hawaiʻi at Mānoa alumni
Stanford University alumni
Adelphi University alumni
Adelphi University faculty
American dramatists and playwrights